The men's 4 × 100 metre freestyle relay event at the 2008 Olympic Games took place on 10–11 August at the Beijing National Aquatics Center in Beijing, China.

Prior to the race, the French team was reported to be very confident of its ultimate victory, with world record holder Alain Bernard saying: "The Americans? We're going to smash them. That’s what we came here for."

Trailing the French team by nearly 6/10th of a second entering the final leg, the U.S. team came from behind to set a new world record and most importantly, to capture the elusive freestyle relay title after 12 years. Diving into the pool at the final exchange, Jason Lezak chased down world record-holder Frenchman Alain Bernard on the 50-metre final length and touched the wall first with a scintillating anchor time of 46.06, the fastest ever split in the event's history, to deliver the foursome of Michael Phelps (47.51, an American record), Garrett Weber-Gale (47.02), and Cullen Jones (47.65) the gold-medal in a world-record time of 3:08.24.  Lezak’s comeback is often considered to be the greatest the sport has ever seen.

After the 1st three legs, France's Amaury Leveaux (47.91), Fabien Gilot (47.05), and Frédérick Bousquet (46.63) had delivered Bernard a lead of more than a half-second (.59).  However, despite producing the 3rd-fastest split of the event, Bernard's time of 46.73 was still 0.67 seconds slower than Lezak's split, leaving the French team with the Silver medal in a European record of 3:08.32. Meanwhile, Eamon Sullivan smashed the world record split of 47.24 to hand the Aussies an early lead, but his teammates Andrew Lauterstein (47.87), Ashley Callus (47.55), and Matt Targett (47.25) could not maintain the pace in the succeeding laps to end the race with a bronze-medal time of 3:09.91.

Italy's Alessandro Calvi (48.49), Christian Galenda (47.49), Marco Belotti (48.23), and Filippo Magnini (47.27) finished fourth in 3:11.65, while the Swedish foursome of Petter Stymne (49.17), five-time Olympian Lars Frölander (48.02), Stefan Nystrand (47.25), and Jonas Persson (47.48) cracked a 3:12-barrier to earn a fifth spot in 3:11.92. Outside the club, Canada's Brent Hayden (47.56, a national record), Joel Greenshields (47.77), Colin Russell (48.49), and three-time Olympian Rick Say (48.44) posted a sixth-place time of 3:12.26, while defending Olympic champions and South African quartet of Lyndon Ferns (48.15), Darian Townsend (48.11), Roland Mark Schoeman (48.32), and Ryk Neethling (48.08) produced a seventh-place effort and an African record of 3:12.66 to lower their standard by more than half a second. Great Britain's Simon Burnett (48.34), Adam Brown (47.75), Benjamin Hockin (48.50), and Ross Davenport (48.28) rounded out the field in eighth place at 3:12.87. Due to the presence of technology suits in the pool, all eight teams completed a historic relay finish under a 3:13-barrier.

Earlier in the prelims, the U.S. men's team of Nathan Adrian (48.82), Cullen Jones (47.61), Ben Wildman-Tobriner (48.03), and Matt Grevers (47.77) took down the world record of 3:12.23 to cut off their own standard by 23-hundredths of a second.

Records
Prior to this competition, the existing world and Olympic records were as follows.

The following new world and Olympic records were set during this competition.

Results

Heats

Final

New records and feats

In the heats, the United States team set a world record with a team missing some of America's major stars such as Michael Phelps. France and Australia also went faster than the old record even though they rested Alain Bernard and Eamon Sullivan respectively. During the heats, all five of the continental records were broken.

In the final, the United States, France, Australia, Italy, and Sweden teams all finished within the world-record time set by the American team in the heats, the Canada team finished within what was the World record prior to the 2008 Olympics, and all of the teams finished within what was the Olympic record prior to the 2008 Olympics. The world record time was reduced by over 2% during the course of the heats and the final.  Italy and Sweden failed to medal despite besting the previous world record.

The faster times can also be seen in contrast to the 2004 Olympics in Athens, in which the South African squad took home the gold medal in world-record fashion. South Africa returned all four members of that 2004 relay team to these Olympics, and they even bettered their previous world-record time by 0.51 s, yet they finished a distant 7th place in Beijing. In fact, all 8 teams swimming in the 2008 finals swam faster than South Africa's gold medal swim of 2004.

It is also possible for the swimmers in the first leg to break records for the 100 m freestyle. In the heats, Amaury Leveaux of France broke the Olympic record, while the world record fell to Australian Eamon Sullivan in the final. Split times for swimmers not swimming the first leg are ineligible because the incoming swimmer can lean over in front of the blocks and be diving as the preceding swimmer is coming in, whereas the leadoff swimmer is timed from a stationary start. Thus, the world record was Sullivan's, even though five swimmers in the finals alone had faster times, including Jason Lezak, whose 46.06 seconds is the fastest individual leg in a 100 m freestyle or medley relay in history. Two days later, Alain Bernard reclaimed the record for France, recording a 47.20 time in the first semifinal of the 100m freestyle, only to have Sullivan break the record again, winning the second semifinal in 47.05 seconds.

The final included a dramatic finish with American Jason Lezak swimming the final 50 meters 0.9 seconds faster than Frenchman Alain Bernard to win the race. He also swam the fastest relay split in history. Dan Hicks and Rowdy Gaines had the call on NBC:

References

External links
Official Olympic Report

Men's freestyle relay 4 by 100 metre
4 × 100 metre freestyle relay
Men's events at the 2008 Summer Olympics